"Scenes from an Italian Restaurant" is a song from Billy Joel's 1977 album The Stranger. In 2021, Rolling Stone ranked it the 324th greatest song of all time on their updated 500 Greatest Songs of All Time list.

Release 

Although never released as a single, it's become one of Joel's most celebrated compositions among fans and critics alike; it appears on most of his compilation albums and is a live favorite. In an interview, Joel cites the second side of The Beatles' album Abbey Road as one of its primary musical influences.

At 7 minutes and 37 seconds, it is the longest of Joel's rock music studio cuts, only surpassed by live recordings and five tracks from Joel's 2001 classical album Fantasies & Delusions. On May 6, 1977, before the song's official release, Joel premiered it in a performance at the C.W. Post Campus of Long Island University. Joel dedicated that performance to Christiano's, a restaurant in the nearby hamlet of Syosset, which operated until February 2014. Joel admitted, years later, the shout-out to the local restaurant was similar to shouting out "Yankees" at a Manhattan concert.

Composition and analysis 
The song is effectively a medley of three distinct pieces. "Italian Restaurant" begins as a gentle, melodic piano ballad depicting, in the first person, a scene of two old classmates reuniting in an Italian restaurant. This segues into a triumphant and uptempo jazz-influenced section as the classmates catch up with each other's lives and begin to reminisce. Clarinet, trombone, tuba and saxophone solos then lead into a rock and roll section (which Joel calls "The Ballad of Brenda and Eddie"). This section tells a story in the third person about high school sweethearts who were an "it" couple, who marry young and quickly divorce. The tempo then slows as the song transitions back to the style of the first section and the two part fondly, with one character remarking "I'll meet you anytime you want / At our Italian restaurant."

Introduction (Italian restaurant) (0:00–1:43) 
The song starts with a piano introduction in the style of a medium ballad (70 bpm). The first lines "A bottle of white, a bottle of red" are told in a first person and set up the scene of an Italian restaurant. Joel himself remarked that this is used as a framing story, with friends reminiscing on the good old days. The lines "I'll meet you anytime you want / In our Italian restaurant" ends this section and transitions to a saxophone solo played by Richie Cannata on a tenor saxophone. It is used as a transition piece between entering the restaurant and the discussion.

Transition and Dixieland jazz (1:44–2:47) 
The tempo increases to about 95 bpm with a staccato piano driving forward. The narrator tells the others that "Things are okay with me these days / I got a good job, I got a good office". This is small talk before they continue and discuss the past. With the lines "Do you remember those days hanging out at the village green?" the style changes to Dixieland jazz. Joel makes a reference to this style change in the lines "You dropped a dime in the box and played a song about New Orleans", referring to where the style of music originated. A soprano saxophone melody is played over traditional Dixieland instrumentals such as tuba, clarinet, and trombone.

Piano solo (2:48–3:02) 
The piano solo is a fast-paced piece used as a transition between the framing story of the Italian restaurant and their high school days. Joel uses alternating octaves in the bass and plays a descending melody in the right hand.

The Ballad of Brenda and Eddie (3:03–5:59) 
The longest section of the song is what Joel himself calls "The Ballad of Brenda and Eddie", and is a rock and roll piece. In this, the narrator (in third person) discusses a high school romance between Brenda and Eddie, and their journey through love. He says "Brenda and Eddie were the popular steadies and the king and the queen of the prom", and "Nobody looked any finer / Or was more of a hit at the Parkway Diner / We never knew we could want more than that out of life / Surely Brenda and Eddie would always know how to survive". This shows that they were seemingly the ideal couple and would always get by. The narrator then says that they decided to get married in the summer of 1975, and that "Everyone said they were crazy". However, he indicates that this spark of romance began to fizzle out once time moved on, saying "They started to fight when the money got tight / And they just didn't count on the tears". Then the narrator says that they got a divorce. Joel comments on the carefree days of teenage life, and how it drastically changes once people reach adulthood, and that sooner or later everyone will have to learn how to move on.

Outro (6:00–7:37) 
The transition to the final section includes a grandiose string section which then diminishes back to piano and the style of the introduction, indicating that the song is now back to the Italian restaurant. The final lyrics solidify that we are back in this time period. The song ends with a saxophone solo similar to the first.

Personnel 
 Billy Joel – lead and backing vocals, acoustic piano
 Dominic Cortese – accordion
 Steve Burgh – electric lead guitar
 Hugh McCracken – acoustic rhythm guitar
 Doug Stegmeyer – bass
 Liberty DeVitto – drums
 Richie Cannata – saxophone, flute, clarinet

Legacy

Reception 
The song has been highly acclaimed in retrospective reviews, with Scott Floman, music critic for Goldmine magazine, describing the song as an "epic multi-sectioned masterpiece which starts as a slow smoky ballad, builds up to a jaunty piano rocker with a New Orleans flavor that also shows off Joel's knack for telling stories and creating rhymes, before finally returning to smoky ballad territory again."

Record World regarded it as the "centerpiece" of The Stranger.

It is ranked number 324 on Rolling Stone'''s list of The 500 Greatest Songs of All Time.

 Joel's comments 
After years of speculation about exactly which restaurant inspired the song, Joel stated in an interview included on 2008's The Stranger 30th Anniversary Edition DVD that the song was written about Fontana di Trevi, a restaurant across from Carnegie Hall, which he frequented during a series of June 1977 concerts. The song's signature line: "A bottle of red, a bottle of white, whatever kind of mood you're in tonight" was actually spoken to him by a waiter at Fontana di Trevi while Joel ordered. He has further stated that the restaurant in the story has more than one real-life counterpart; however, Fontana di Trevi was on his mind while he was writing the song.

In an interview on The Late Show with Stephen Colbert, Joel named this song as his favorite of his own compositions.

 Movin' Out 
The characters of Brenda and Eddie from this song became major characters in the 2002 Broadway production Movin' Out. The song tells the tale of the two through their love in high school, their marriage, and finally to their divorce shortly after. Movin' Out tells this story among others, although with a slight lyrical change, as the Brenda-and-Eddie story in Movin' Out'' takes place in 1965 instead of 1975.

See also 
 Billy Joel discography

References 

1970s ballads
1977 songs
Billy Joel songs
Music medleys
Songs written by Billy Joel
Song recordings produced by Phil Ramone